Real Life is the ninth studio album by Scottish rock band Simple Minds, released in April 1991. This was the first Simple Minds album recorded without keyboardist and original bandmember Mick MacNeil, who left the band shortly after the previous tour completed in 1990. The core band on this album comprise only Jim Kerr, Charlie Burchill, and Mel Gaynor (who all appear on the rear cover), with the remaining personnel all being session musicians.

Content 
The album features several songs that are reworkings of older material or were reworked into new songs on subsequent releases. 
 "Let the Children Speak" is based on the 1981 Simple Minds instrumental "Theme for Great Cities" from Sister Feelings Call. A re-recorded version of that piece, called "Theme for Great Cities '91", appeared as a B-side of the "See the Lights" single. 
 "Travelling Man" bears some resemblance to the 1983 song "Waterfront" from Sparkle in the Rain. 
 "When Two Worlds Collide" is based on the title track "Real Life", as is the 1995 song "And the Band Played On", which subsequently appeared on the following album, Good News from the Next World. "Women and Ghosts" (included on the US edition of the 1995 single "Hypnotised") is a reworked instrumental version of the title track. 
 "Rivers of Ice" is based on "Dr. Mackay's Farewell to Creagorry", an instrumental written by accordionist Iain MacLachlan in 1958. It gained prominence when adapted for the 1962 BBC thriller The Dark Island.

The original album cover was replaced in later pressings by the original rear cover shot of the band (see infobox).

Release 

The album reached no. 2 in the UK, and no. 74 in the United States. Four singles from the album were Top 40 hits in the UK, including the Top 10 hit "Let There Be Love". In the US, "See the Lights" reached the Top 40 and also reached no. 1 on the US Modern Rock Tracks chart.

Virgin reissued the CD as part of the Simple Minds remasters in late 2002 and early 2003. On the remastered version, a couple of differences are apparent when compared to the first edition: the 2002/2003 remaster features an extended mix of "Let There Be Love", not the one used on the first edition of the album, although it is not mentioned on the cover or in the booklet; the segues between tracks have also been re-edited, so that the running time of individual tracks may differ slightly between the editions; also, the CD version of the first edition had "Banging on the Door" split into two tracks in the disc's table of contents (running time was 1:16 + 4:22), but the music as such did not indicate any break between the parts. On the 2002/2003 reissue, the track is indexed as one.

Reception 

The album received mostly negative reviews. 
In Rolling Stone, Paul Evans said, "What might have been the band's most cohesive record misses, if only by frustrating inches."

AllMusic's Alex Henderson opined, "Real Life isn't terrible, but play it next to any of [the band's previous three] albums, and you're reminded how much less inspired their writing had become by the early '90s."

Track listing

Personnel

Simple Minds
Jim Kerr – vocals
Charlie Burchill – guitar, keyboards
Mel Gaynor – drums

Additional musicians
Alfred Bos – shaft guitar on "African Skies"
Andy Duncan – percussion
Malcolm Foster – bass
Lisa Germano – violin
Carol Kenyon – backing vocals
Stephen Lipson – production, bass, keyboards, odaiko
Wil Malone – orchestral arrangements
Sonia Morgan Jones – backing vocals
Peter-John Vettese – keyboards
Gavyn Wright – string conductor, string section leader

Studio personnel
Dougie Cowan – technical master
Giles Cowley – mixing, mixing assistant
Tony Donald – equipment coordinator, equipment technician
Simon Fowler – art direction, design, photography, stylist
Efren Herrera – engineer
Simon Heyworth – mastering
Ted Jensen – mastering
Paul Kerr – logistics
Will Malone – orchestration, orchestral arrangements
Heff Moraes – engineer, MIDI engineer, MIDI manager
Stylorouge – art direction, design
Gary Thomas – engineer
Au Yeung, Ying Ho – catering
Jane Ventom – A&R

Charts

Weekly charts

Year-end charts

Singles

Certifications

References

External links

1991 albums
Albums produced by Stephen Lipson
Simple Minds albums
Virgin Records albums